Allium macranthum is an Asian species of wild onion native to Bhutan, Sikkim, Gansu, Shaanxi, Sichuan and Tibet. It grows in wet places at elevations of 2700–4200 metres.

Allium macranthum has short, thick roots and a cylindrical bulb. Scapes are up to 60 cm tall. Leaves are flat, long, and thin, about the same length as the scapes but less than 2 cm across. Umbels have only a few purple, bell-shaped flowers.

References

Onions
plummerae
Flora of temperate Asia
Plants described in 1874
Taxa named by John Gilbert Baker